Milton John Piepul (September 14, 1918 – March 19, 1994) was an American football player, coach, and college athletics administrator.  He played college football for the Notre Dame Fighting Irish football team.  He was selected as a second-team fullback on the 1939 College Football All-America Team and a third-team player on the 1940 team. He was drafted by the Detroit Lions with the 95th pick in the 1941 NFL draft and played for the Lions during the 1941 NFL season.  Piepul served as the head football coach at American International College from 1971 to 1975 and as the school's athletic director from 1971 to 1986.  Previously he was an assistant football coach at Dartmouth College, Brown University, and the College of the Holy Cross.

References

1918 births
1994 deaths
American football fullbacks
American International Yellow Jackets athletic directors
American International Yellow Jackets football coaches
Brown Bears football coaches
Dartmouth Big Green football coaches
Detroit Lions players
Holy Cross Crusaders football coaches
Notre Dame Fighting Irish football players
Sportspeople from Springfield, Massachusetts
Players of American football from Massachusetts